Melokletsky is a rural locality (a khutor) in Kletskoye Rural Settlement, Kletsky District, Volgograd Oblast, Russia. The population was 232 as of 2010. There are 2 streets.

Geography 
Melokletsky is located on the Don River, 7 km southeast of Kletskaya (the district's administrative centre) by road. Kletskaya is the nearest rural locality.

References 

Rural localities in Kletsky District